Hubaysh District is a district of the Ibb Governorate, Yemen. In 2003, the district had a population of 105,998.

References

Districts of Ibb Governorate
Hubaysh District